Hrvat means Croat in South Slavic languages.

Hrvat may also refer to:

 MF Hrvat (built 2007), a ship owned by Croatian shipping company Jadrolinija
 Rajko Hrvat (born 1986), Slovenian rower
 Fahrija Hrvat (born 1949), Bosnian footballer

See also
 Horvat
 Hrovat
 Hrvatski (disambiguation)